The University of Technology Australian Football Club (mostly known as the UTS Australian Football Club), nicknamed as The Bats, is an Australian rules football club based in the eastern suburbs of Sydney. It competes in various Sydney AFL competitions, fielding 5 senior men's sides in the Premier Division, Premier Division Reserves, Division One, Division Three and Under 19s Division One competitions, and 3 senior women's sides in the Premier Division, Division One and Division Three competitions.  

The club plays its home games at Trumper Park Oval in Paddington, New South Wales and at Waverley Oval in Bondi, New South Wales. It trains at Trumper Park Oval in Paddington and Bat and Ball Oval in Moore Park, New South Wales. The club is affiliated with the University of Technology, Sydney.

History 
The club was founded in 2000 by Marty Lynch, a University of Technology, Sydney student at the time, adopting the "Bats" nickname as a result of an initial sponsorship from Bacardi Rum. The club was founded after competing in the 1998 and 1999 Australian University Games.

Club colours
The club follows the colours of the University of Technology, Sydney, which are teal and black; however, this is also referenced as green and black.

Home grounds
2000 - Current  Trumper Park Oval, Paddington
2012 - Current  Waverely Oval, Bondi, New South Wales

Premierships
2000 - Sydney AFL SDivision Two Premiers
2002 - Sydney AFL Division Two Premiers
2004 - Sydney AFL Division One Reserves
2006 - Sydney AFL Division One Seniors, Division One Reserves
2007 - Sydney AFL First Division Reserves
2008 - Sydney AFL First Division Senior, First Division Reserves
2009 - Sydney AFL First Division
2010 - Sydney AFL First Division
2014 - Sydney AFL Fourth Division 
2015 - Sydney AFL Fifth Division 
2016 - Sydney AFL First Division, Fourth Division, Women's First Division

Intervarsity
The club also participates in inter-varsity football at both the state and national level. The club has competed at every Australian University Games since 1998.

Notes

External links
 
Woollahra Municipal Council - Trumper Park

Australian rules football clubs in Sydney
University Australian rules football clubs
2000 establishments in Australia
Australian rules football clubs established in 2000
University of Technology Sydney